The Boudoir: A Magazine of Scandal, Facetiae etc. was an erotic magazine published in London in the 1880s by William Lazenby. It was  a continuation of The Pearl and existed between 1883 and 1884.

Reprints
 The Boudoir: A Victorian Magazine of Scandal, etc., Grove Press, New York, 1971

References

 Donald McCormick, Richard Deacon, "Erotic literature: a connoisseur's guide", Continuum, 1992, p. 61
 Vance Randolph, "Unprintable Ozark Folksongs and Folklore: Blow the candle out", Volume 2 of Roll Me in Your Arms: Unprintable Ozark Folksongs and Folklore, ed. Gershon Legman, University of Arkansas Press, 1992, p. 898

Erotica magazines published in the United Kingdom
Defunct magazines published in the United Kingdom
Magazines published in London
Magazines established in 1883
Magazines disestablished in 1884